Zēṛōk is the main town of Zerok District in Paktika Province, Afghanistan. It is located within the heart of Zadran land on the main Khost-Urgun road.

See also
 Khost
 Loya Paktia

References

Populated places in Paktika Province